Justin Rolph Loomis (August 21, 1810 – June 22, 1898) was the fourth president of Bucknell University from 1858 to 1879.

Loomis was married three times. He constructed and lived in a three-story home on South Third Street in Lewisburg, still standing today.  He was also instrumental in the construction of the President's Home on the Bucknell campus, and the Baptist Church on South Third Street in Lewisburg.   Loomis Field at the university is named in his honor.
He is buried in the Lewisburg Cemetery on South Seventh Street in Lewisburg.

References

External links
 
 
  The elements of geology adapted to the use of schools and colleges, Justin Rolph Loomis, 1852, Gould and Lincoln (Boston)

Presidents of Bucknell University
Colby College faculty
1810 births
1898 deaths